Sathnam Sanghera (born 1976) is a British journalist and best-selling author.

Early life and education

Sathnam Sanghera was born to Indian Punjabi parents in Wolverhampton in 1976. His parents had emigrated from India to the UK in 1968. He was raised a Punjabi boy. He attended Wolverhampton Grammar School and graduated from Christ's College, Cambridge, with a first-class degree in English Language and Literature in 1998.

Career

Before becoming a writer, Sanghera worked at a burger chain, a hospital laundry, a market research firm, a sewing factory and a literacy project in New York. As a student he worked at the Express and Star in Wolverhampton and dressed up as a "news bunny" for L!VE TV. Between 1998 and 2006 he was a reporter and feature writer for the Financial Times.

He joined The Times as a columnist and feature writer in 2007. He also writes the motoring column for Management Today magazine. His memoir, The Boy with the Topknot (2009) was adapted for BBC Two in 2017. His novel Marriage Material, originally published in 2013, was inspired in part by Arnold Bennett's The Old Wives' Tale.

In 2016, Sanghera was elected a Fellow of the Royal Society of Literature.

In November 2021, his Channel 4 documentary series about race, Empire State of Mind, got a four star review in The Guardian from Chitra Ramaswamy.

Personal life

Sanghera lives in North London.

Publications

  The Boy with the Topknot: A Memoir of Love, Secrets and Lies in Wolverhampton. Published by Penguin, 2008, . 
 Marriage Material. Published by Europa Editions, 2016, .
 EmpireLand: How Imperialism has Shaped Modern Britain. Published by Viking, 2021, .
 Stolen History: the Truth About the British Empire and How It Shaped Us. Published by Penguin, 2023, ISBN 978-0-241-62343-5.

Awards

 Young Journalist of the Year at the British Press Awards, 2002.
 Article of the Year in the 2005 Management Today Writing Awards.
 Newspaper Feature of the Year, Workworld Media Awards.
 Journalist of the Year, Watson Wyatt Awards, 2006 and 2009.
 Shortlisted for the Costa Biography Award, 2009
 Shortlisted for the PEN/Ackerley Prize, 2009. 
 Winner, Mind Book of the Year, 2009.
 Honorary Doctor of Letters for services to journalism, University of Wolverhampton, September 2009.
 President's Medal, Royal College of Psychiatrists, 2010.
 Costa Book Awards (First Novel) shortlisted for Marriage Material

See also 
 List of British Sikhs
 David Olusoga

References

External links
 

1976 births
Living people
Alumni of Christ's College, Cambridge
British people of Indian descent
British people of Punjabi descent
British Sikhs
English male journalists
British memoirists
Fellows of the Royal Society of Literature
People educated at Wolverhampton Grammar School
People from Wolverhampton
The Times people